The Greek frigate Spetsai (F-453) is the second ship of the Greek Hydra frigate class. She is based on the Blohm + Voss MEKO 200 frigate class and was built by Hellenic Shipyards Co. at Skaramagas. She is the fifth ship of the Hellenic Navy to be named after the Saronic Gulf island of Spetses. She has participated in international operations such as Enduring Freedom.

References

External links
Official Hellenic Navy page for Hydra Class Frigates

Ships built in Greece
1993 ships
Hydra-class frigates
Frigates of Greece